Juwan Simpson (born Juwan Garth on July 8, 1984) is the defensive line coach for the Calgary Stampeders of the Canadian Football League (CFL) and is a former professional gridiron football linebacker who played for eight seasons with the Stampeders.

College career
Simpson played college football for the Alabama Crimson Tide.

Professional career
Simpson was signed by the Green Bay Packers as an undrafted free agent in 2007. He was later signed by the Calgary Stampeders with whom he played with for eight seasons where he won two Grey Cup championships in 2008 and 2014. He announced his retirement on October 10, 2019, four years after his last game with the Stampeders.

Coaching career
On January 3, 2023, it was announced that Simpson had been hired as the defensive line coach for the Calgary Stampeders.

References

External links
Calgary Stampeders bio 

1984 births
Living people
Alabama Crimson Tide football players
American football linebackers
American players of Canadian football
Calgary Stampeders players
Canadian football defensive linemen
Canadian football linebackers
Players of American football from Alabama
Sportspeople from Decatur, Alabama
Green Bay Packers players